John B. Skillman is a United States Navy rear admiral who has served as the Director of Programming of the U.S. Navy since July 7, 2020. Previously, he served as the Director of Enterprise Support of the United States Navy.

References

External links

Year of birth missing (living people)
Living people
Place of birth missing (living people)
United States Navy admirals